This is a list of award winners and league leaders for the Cleveland Guardians of Major League Baseball.

Awards

Most Valuable Player

George Burns (1926)
Lou Boudreau (1948)
Al Rosen (1953)

Cy Young

Gaylord Perry (1972)
CC Sabathia (2007)
Cliff Lee (2008)
Corey Kluber (2014, 2017) 
Shane Bieber (2020)

Triple Crown

 Bob Feller (1940)
 Shane Bieber (2020)

Rookie of the Year

Herb Score (1955)
Chris Chambliss (1971)
Joe Charboneau (1980)
Sandy Alomar Jr. (1990)

Manager of the Year

Eric Wedge (2007)
Terry Francona (2013, 2016, 2022)

Gold Glove Award

Minnie Miñoso (1959)
Vic Power (1958, 1959, 1960, 1961)
Jim Piersall (1961)
Vic Davalillo (1964)
Ray Fosse (1970, 1971)
Rick Manning (1976)
Sandy Alomar Jr. (1990)
Kenny Lofton (1993, 1994, 1995,  1996)
Omar Vizquel (1994, 1995, 1996, 1997, 1998, 1999, 2000, 2001)
Matt Williams (1997)
Roberto Alomar (1999, 2000, 2001)
Travis Fryman (2000)
Grady Sizemore (2007, 2008)
Francisco Lindor (2016, 2019)
Roberto Pérez (2019, 2020)
César Hernández (2020)
Shane Bieber (2022)
Andrés Giménez (2022)
Steven Kwan (2022)
Myles Straw (2022)

Silver Slugger Award

Andre Thornton (1984)
Julio Franco (1988)
Carlos Baerga (1992, 1993)
Albert Belle (1993, 1994, 1995, 1996)
Manny Ramirez (1995, 1999, 2000)
Jim Thome (1996)
David Justice (1997)
Matt Williams (1997)
Roberto Alomar (1999, 2000)
Juan Gonzalez (2001)
Victor Martinez (2004)
Grady Sizemore (2008)
Asdrúbal Cabrera (2011)
Michael Brantley (2014)
Yan Gomes (2014)
Francisco Lindor (2017, 2018)
Carlos Santana (2019)
José Ramírez (2017, 2018, 2020, 2022)

Edgar Martínez Award

Ellis Burks (2002)

MLB "This Year in Baseball Awards"

Note: These awards were renamed the "GIBBY Awards" in 2010 and then the "Esurance MLB Awards" in 2015.

"GIBBY Awards" Best Breakout Pitcher
Corey Kluber

"GIBBY Awards" Best Hitting Performance
Lonnie Chisenhall (2014) – for "Chisenhall's career night" (June 9)

Wilson defensive awards

 Roberto Perez (2019)

Lee MacPhail MVP Award (ALCS)

Orel Hershiser (1995)
Marquis Grissom (1997)
Andrew Miller

DHL Hometown Heroes (2006)

Bob Feller – voted by MLB fans as the most outstanding player in the history of the franchise, based on on-field performance, leadership quality and character value

Team award
 – American League pennant
 – World Series championship
 – American League pennant
 – World Series championship
 – American League pennant
 – Baseball America Organization of the Year
1995 – William Harridge Trophy (American League championship)
1997 – William Harridge Trophy (American League championship)
2016 – William Harridge Trophy (American League championship)

Team records (single-game, single-season, career)

Other achievements

Cleveland Guardians Hall of Fame
For a virtual tour, see footnote
For photos of inductees' plaques, see footnote

The Guardians Hall of Fame is located at Heritage Park at Progressive Field. Opened in 2007 – in the centerfield area of Progressive Field – Heritage Park contains bronze plaques and other exhibits honoring the franchise's history.

Greater Cleveland Sports Hall of Fame

Cleveland Chapter / BBWAA awards

Cleveland Indians Man of the Year Award
See footnote
The "Cleveland Indians Man of the Year Award" was established in 1946, but was renamed the "Bob Feller Man of the Year Award" in 2010.

From 1937 to 1943, the award was known as the "Cleveland Indians Most Valuable Player Award" chosen by the Cleveland BBWAA.
There were no awards given for the years 1944 and 1945.

Frank Gibbons-Steve Olin Good Guy Award

See footnote

Associated Press Athlete of the Year

Lou Boudreau (1948)

Bob Feller Act of Valor Award

American League Statistical Leaders

Batting
Batting Average
Nap Lajoie (.344, 1903)
Nap Lajoie (.376, 1904)
Elmer Flick (.308, 1905)
Nap Lajoie (.384, 1910)
Tris Speaker (.386, 1916)
Lew Fonseca (.369, 1929)
Lou Boudreau (.355, 1948)
Bobby Ávila (.341, 1954)
On-base percentage
Nap Lajoie (.413, 1904)
Joe Jackson (.468, 1911)
Tris Speaker (.470, 1916)
Tris Speaker (.474, 1922)
Tris Speaker (.479, 1925)
Larry Doby (.442, 1950)
Mike Hargrove (.424, 1981)
Slugging Percentage
Nap Lajoie (.518, 1903)
Nap Lajoie (.552, 1904)
Elmer Flick (.462, 1905)
Joe Jackson (.551, 1913)
Tris Speaker (.502, 1916)
Larry Doby (.541, 1952)
Al Rosen (.613, 1953)
Rocky Colavito (.620, 1958)
Albert Belle (.690, 1995)
Manny Ramirez (.663, 1999)
Manny Ramirez (.697, 2000)
Jim Thome (.677, 2002)
OPS
Nap Lajoie (.896, 1903)
Nap Lajoie (.965, 1904)
Elmer Flick (.845, 1905)
Joe Jackson (1.011, 1913)
Tris Speaker (.972, 1916)
Larry Doby (.986, 1950)
Al Rosen (1.034, 1953)
Manny Ramirez (1.105, 1999)
Manny Ramirez (1.154, 2000) Team Record
Jim Thome (1.122, 2002)
Travis Hafner(1.097, 2006)
Games
Elmer Flick (157, 1906)
Nap Lajoie (157, 1908)
Nap Lajoie (159, 1910)
Larry Gardner (154, 1920) Co-Leader
Joe Sewell (155, 1928) Co-Leader
Johnny Hodapp (154, 1930) Co-Leader
Earl Averill (154, 1934) Co-Leader
Hal Trosky (154, 1934) Co-Leader
Hal Trosky (154, 1935)
Bill Knickerbocker (155, 1936) Co-Leader
Ken Keltner (154, 1939) Co-Leader
Lou Boudreau (155, 1940) Co-Leader
Les Fleming (156, 1942)
Mickey Rocco (155, 1944) Co-Leader
Al Rosen (154, 1951) Co-Leader
Al Smith (154, 1955) Co-Leader
Leon Wagner (162, 1964) Co-Leader Team Record
Rocky Colavito (162, 1965) Co-Leader
Toby Harrah (162, 1982) Co-Leader
Joe Carter (162, 1989) Co-Leader
Grady Sizemore (162, 2006) Co-Leader
At Bats
Elmer Flick (624, 1906)
Nap Lajoie (591, 1910)
Charlie Jamieson (644, 1923) Co-Leader
Carl Lind (650, 1928)
Earl Averill (627, 1931)
Mickey Rocco (653, 1944)
Dale Mitchell (640, 1949)
Julio Franco (658, 1984)
Joe Carter (651, 1989) Co-Leader
Kenny Lofton (662, 1996)
Runs
Elmer Flick (98, 1906)
Ray Chapman (84, 1918)
Larry Doby (104, 1952)
Al Rosen (115, 1953)
Al Smith (123, 1955)
Albert Belle (121, 1995) Co-Leader
Roberto Alomar (138, 1999)
Grady Sizemore (134, 2006)
José Ramírez (45, 2020)
Hits
Nap Lajoie (208, 1904)
Nap Lajoie (214, 1906)
Nap Lajoie (227, 1910)
Joe Jackson (226, 1912) Co-Leader
Joe Jackson (197, 1913)
Tris Speaker (211, 1916)
Charlie Jamieson (222, 1923)
George Burns (216, 1926) Co-Leader
Johnny Hodapp (225, 1930)
Joe Vosmik (216, 1935)
Earl Averill (232, 1936)
Dale Mitchell (203, 1949)
Kenny Lofton (160, 1994)
Total Bases
Nap Lajoie (305, 1904)
Nap Lajoie (304, 1910)
Joe Jackson (331, 1912)
Hal Trosky (405, 1936) Team Record
Al Rosen (297, 1952)
Al Rosen (367, 1953)
Rocky Colavito (301, 1959)
Albert Belle (294, 1994)
Albert Belle (377, 1995)
Doubles
Nap Lajoie (49, 1904)
Nap Lajoie (48, 1906)
Nap Lajoie (51, 1910)
Joe Jackson (39, 1913)
Jack Graney (41, 1916) Co-Leader
Tris Speaker (41, 1916) Co-Leader
Tris Speaker (33, 1918)
Tris Speaker (50, 1920)
Tris Speaker (52, 1921)
Tris Speaker (48, 1922)
Tris Speaker (59, 1923)
Joe Sewell (45, 1924) Co-Leader
George Burns (64, 1926) Team Record
Johnny Hodapp (51, 1930)
Joe Vosmik (47, 1935)
Lou Boudreau (45, 1941)
Lou Boudreau (45, 1944)
Lou Boudreau (45, 1947)
Tito Francona (36, 1960)
Albert Belle (52, 1995) Co-Leader
Grady Sizemore (53, 2006)
José Ramírez (56, 2017)
Triples
Elmer Flick (18, 1905)
Elmer Flick (22, 1906)
Elmer Flick (18, 1907)
Joe Jackson (26, 1912) Team Record
Joe Vosmik (20, 1935)
Earl Averill (15, 1936) Co-Leader
Jeff Heath (18, 1938)
Jeff Heath (20, 1941)
Hank Edwards (16, 1946)
Dale Mitchell (23, 1949)
Bobby Ávila (11, 1952)
Brett Butler (14, 1986)
Kenny Lofton (13, 1995)
Home Runs
Al Rosen (43, 1953)
Rocky Colavito (42, 1959) Co-Leader
Albert Belle (50, 1995)

RBI
Nap Lajoie (102, 1904)
Hal Trosky (162, 1936)
Al Rosen (105, 1952)
Al Rosen (145, 1953)
Larry Doby (126, 1954)
Rocky Colavito (108, 1965)
Joe Carter (121, 1986)
Albert Belle (129, 1993)
Albert Belle (126, 1995)
Albert Belle (148, 1996)
Manny Ramirez (165, 1999) Team Record
Walks
Jack Graney (94, 1917)
Ray Chapman (84, 1918)
Jack Graney (105, 1919)
Rocky Colavito (93, 1965)
Jim Thome (120, 1997)
Jim Thome (127, 1999) Team Record
Jim Thome (122, 2002)
Carlos Santana (113, 2014)
Strikeouts
Braggo Roth (73, 1917)
Ed Morgan (66, 1930) Co-Leader
Pat Seerey (99, 1944)
Pat Seerey (97, 1945)
Pat Seerey (101, 1946) Co-Leader
Larry Doby (111, 1952) Co-Leader
Larry Doby (121, 1953)
Jim Thome (171, 1999)
Jim Thome (185, 2001) Team Record
Stolen Bases
Harry Bay (45, 1903)
Harry Bay (38, 1904) Co-Leader
Elmer Flick (38, 1904) Co-Leader
Elmer Flick (39, 1906) Co-Leader
George Case (28, 1946)
Kenny Lofton (66, 1992)
Kenny Lofton (70, 1993)
Kenny Lofton (60, 1994)
Kenny Lofton (54, 1995)
Kenny Lofton (75, 1996) Team Record
Singles
Nap Lajoie (165, 1910)
Tris Speaker (160, 1916)
Charlie Jamieson (172, 1923) Team Record
Charlie Jamieson (168, 1924)
Dale Mitchell (162, 1948)
Dale Mitchell (161, 1949)
Carlos Baerga (152, 1992)
Kenny Lofton (148, 1993)
Kenny Lofton (107, 1994) Co-Leader
Runs Created
Nap Lajoie (124, 1904)
Nap Lajoie (134, 1910)
Joe Jackson (133, 1913)
Tris Speaker (128, 1916)
Al Rosen (153, 1953)
Manny Ramirez (151, 1999) Co-Leader
Extra-Base Hits
Nap Lajoie (70, 1904)
Nap Lajoie (62, 1910)
Hal Trosky (96, 1936)
Al Rosen (75, 1953)
Rocky Colavito (70, 1958)
Rocky Colavito (66, 1959)
Albert Belle (73, 1994) Co-Leader
Albert Belle (103, 1995) Team Record
Grady Sizemore (92, 2006)
José Ramírez (91, 2017)
José Ramírez (34, 2020)
Times on Base
Nap Lajoie (292, 1910)
Joe Jackson (282, 1913)
Tris Speaker (297, 1916)
Tris Speaker (217, 1918)
Al Rosen (290, 1953)
Al Smith (294, 1955)
Rocky Colavito (266, 1965)
Hit By Pitch
Bill Hinchman (15, 1907)
Braggo Roth (8, 1918) Co-Leader
Lew Fonseca (7, 1929)
Earl Averill (6, 1932) Co-Leader
Frankie Pytlak (5, 1934) Co-Leader
Larry Doby (7, 1949) Co-Leader
Luke Easter (10, 1950) Co-Leader
Al Rosen (10, 1950) Co-Leader
Minnie Miñoso (15, 1958)
Minnie Miñoso (17, 1959) Team Record
Max Alvis (10, 1963)
Max Alvis (9, 1965) Co-Leader
Roy Foster (12, 1970)
Travis Hafner (17, 2004) Team Record
Sacrifice Hits
Bill Bradley (46, 1907)
Bill Bradley (60, 1908)
Ray Chapman (45, 1913)
Terry Turner (38, 1914) Co-Leader
Ray Chapman (67, 1917) Team Record
Ray Chapman (50, 1919)
Bill Wambsganss (43, 1921)
Bill Wambsganss (42, 1922)
Freddy Spurgeon (35, 1926)
Joe Sewell (41, 1929)
Lou Boudreau (14, 1941) Co-Leader
Lou Boudreau (15, 1946) Co-Leader
Bobby Ávila (19, 1954)
Bobby Ávila (18, 1955)
Dick Howser (16, 1964) Co-Leader
Eddie Leon (23, 1970)
Félix Fermín (32, 1989)
Omar Vizquel (16, 1997)
Omar Vizquel (17, 1999)
Omar Vizquel (20, 2004)
Coco Crisp (13, 2005)
José Ramírez (13, 2014)
Sacrifice Flies
Al Rosen (11, 1954)
Vic Wertz (11, 1957)
Vic Power (12, 1961) Co-Leader
Jack Heidemann (10, 1970) Co-Leader
Albert Belle (14, 1993)
Roberto Alomar (13, 1999)
Juan Gonzalez (16, 2001) Team Record
Intentional Walks
Andre Thornton (18, 1982) Co-Leader Team Record
Grounded into Double Plays
Lou Boudreau (23, 1940)
Rocky Colavito (25, 1965) Co-Leader
Julio Franco (28, 1986) Team Record
At Bats per Strikeout
Nap Lajoie (27.4, 1913)
Nap Lajoie (27.9, 1914)
Tris Speaker (52.3, 1918)
Tris Speaker (42.5, 1920)
Stuffy McInnis (107.4, 1922)
Joe Sewell (152, 1925) Team Record
Joe Sewell (96.3, 1926)
Joe Sewell (81.3, 1927)
Joe Sewell (65.3, 1928)
Joe Sewell (144.5, 1929)
Joe Sewell (117.7, 1930)
Joe Vosmik (40.5, 1934)
Lou Boudreau (36.8, 1946)
Lou Boudreau (53.8, 1947)
Lou Boudreau (62.2, 1948)
Dale Mitchell (58.2, 1949)
Dale Mitchell (56.8, 1952)
Buddy Bell (16.1, 1972)
Félix Fermín (34.3, 1993)
At Bats per Home Run
Charlie Hickman (43.5, 1903)
Bill Hinchman (77.3, 1908)
Pat Seerey (22.8, 1944)
Al Rosen (15.0, 1950)
Luke Easter (14.1, 1952)
Rocky Colavito (11.9, 1958)
Boog Powell (16.1, 1975)
Manny Ramirez (11.9, 1999)
Manny Ramirez (11.6, 2000)
Jim Thome (10.7, 2001)
Jim Thome (9.2, 2002) Team Record
Outs
Ray Chapman (460, 1917)
Bill Wambsganss (485, 1920)
Freddy Spurgeon (470, 1926) Co-Leader
Homer Summa (442, 1927) Co-Leader
Carl Lind (491, 1928)
Mickey Rocco (509, 1944) Co-Leader
Max Alvis (515, 1967) Team Record

Pitching
ERA
Earl Moore (1.74, 1903)
Addie Joss (1.59, 1904)
Addie Joss (1.16, 1908) Team Record
Vean Gregg (1.80, 1911)
Stan Coveleski (2.76, 1923)
Mel Harder (2.95, 1933)
Bob Feller (2.61, 1940)
Gene Bearden (2.43, 1948)
Mike Garcia (2.36, 1949)
Early Wynn (3.20, 1950)
Mike Garcia (2.64, 1954)
Sam McDowell (2.18, 1965)
Luis Tiant (1.60, 1968)
Rick Sutcliffe (2.96, 1982)
Kevin Millwood (2.86, 2005)
Cliff Lee (2.54, 2008)
Corey Kluber (2.25, 2017)
Shane Bieber (1.63, 2020)
Wins
Addie Joss (27, 1907) Co-Leader
Jim Bagby, Sr. (31, 1920) Team Record
George Uhle (26, 1923)
George Uhle (27, 1926)
Bob Feller (24, 1939)
Bob Feller (27, 1940)
Bob Feller (25, 1941)
Bob Feller (26, 1946) Co-Leader
Bob Feller (20, 1947)
Bob Lemon (23, 1950)
Bob Feller (22, 1951)
Bob Lemon (23, 1954) Co-Leader
Early Wynn (23, 1954) Co-Leader
Bob Lemon (18, 1955) Co-Leader
Jim Perry (18, 1960) Co-Leader
Gaylord Perry (24, 1972) Co-Leader
Cliff Lee (22, 2008)
Shane Bieber (8, 2020)
Won–Loss %
Ed Klepfer (.778, 1917)
Jim Bagby, Sr. (.721, 1920)
George Uhle (.711, 1926)
Johnny Allen (.938, 1937) Team Record
Steve Hargan (.786, 1970)
Cliff Lee (.783, 2005)
Cliff Lee (.880, 2008)
Shane Bieber (.889, 2020)
WHIP
Addie Joss (.948, 1903)
Addie Joss (.806, 1908) Team Record
Vean Gregg (1.054, 1911)
Stan Coveleski (1.108, 1920)
Bob Feller (1.133, 1940)
Bob Feller (1.194, 1947)
Bob Lemon (1.226, 1948)
Early Wynn (1.25, 1950)
Mike Garcia (1.125, 1954)
Corey Kluber (0.87, 2017)
Hits Allowed/9IP
Earl Moore (7.12, 1903)
Addie Joss (6.42, 1908)
Vean Gregg (6.33, 1911)
Stan Coveleski (6.09, 1917)
Stan Coveleski (8.11, 1920)
Bob Feller (7.29, 1938)
Bob Feller (6.89, 1939)
Bob Feller (6.88, 1940)
Allie Reynolds (6.34, 1943)
Steve Gromek (7.07, 1944)
Early Wynn (6.99, 1950)
Bob Lemon (6.86, 1952)
Herb Score (5.85, 1956)
Herb Score (6.89, 1959)
Sam McDowell (5.87, 1965)
Sam McDowell (6.02, 1966)
Luis Tiant (5.30, 1968)
Rick Sutcliffe (7.25, 1982)
CC Sabathia (7.44, 2001)
Walks/9IP
Addie Joss (.83, 1908) Team Record
Addie Joss (1.15, 1909)
Sherry Smith (1.53, 1924)
Sherry Smith (1.82, 1925)
Clint Brown (1.71, 1932)
Clint Brown (1.65, 1933)
Mel Harder (1.66, 1935)
Dick Donovan (1.69, 1962)
Dick Donovan (1.22, 1963)
Ralph Terry (1.25, 1965)
Greg Swindell (1.17, 1991)
Cliff Lee (1.37, 2008)
Strikeouts/9IP
Heinie Berger (5.90, 1909)
Guy Morton (5.16, 1918)
Guy Morton (4.53, 1922)
Johnny Allen (6.11, 1936)
Bob Feller (7.78, 1938)
Bob Feller (7.46, 1939)
Bob Feller (7.33, 1940)
Bob Feller (6.82, 1941)
Allie Reynolds (6.84, 1943)
Bob Feller (5.90, 1947)
Early Wynn (6.02, 1950)
Herb Score (9.70, 1955)
Herb Score (9.49, 1956)
Herb Score (8.23, 1959)
Sam McDowell (9.19, 1964)
Sam McDowell (10.71, 1965)
Sam McDowell (10.42, 1966)
Luis Tiant (9.22, 1967)
Sam McDowell (9.47, 1968)
Sam McDowell (8.81, 1969)
Sam McDowell (8.97, 1970)
Len Barker (6.83, 1980)
Len Barker (7.41, 1981)
Shane Bieber (14.198, 2020)
Games
Jim Bagby, Sr. (45, 1918) Co-Leader
Jim Bagby, Sr. (48, 1920)
Johnny Humphries (45, 1938)
Bob Feller (43, 1940)
Bob Feller (44, 1941)
Joe Heving (63, 1944)
Bob Feller (48, 1946)
Ed Klieman (58, 1947)
Ray Narleski (60, 1955)
Saves
Bill Hoffer (3, 1901)
Otto Hess (3, 1906) Co-Leader
Ed Klieman (17, 1947) Co-Leader
Russ Christopher (17, 1948)
Ray Narleski (19, 1955)
Johnny Klippstein (14, 1960) Co-Leader
José Mesa (46, 1995)
Bob Wickman (45, 2005) Co-Leader
Joe Borowski (45, 2007)
Brad Hand (15, 2020)
Innings
Jim Bagby, Sr. (1920)
George Uhle (1923)
George Uhle (1926)
Bob Feller (1939)
Bob Feller (1940)
Bob Feller (343, 1941)
Jim Bagby Jr. (273, 1943)
Bob Feller (1946) Team Record
Bob Feller (299, 1947)
Bob Lemon (1948)
Bob Lemon (288, 1950)
Early Wynn (1951)
Bob Lemon (1952)
Bob Lemon (1953)
Early Wynn (1954)
Sam McDowell (305, 1970) Co-Leader
Strikeouts
Stan Coveleski (133, 1920)
Bob Feller (240, 1938)
Bob Feller (246, 1939)
Bob Feller (261, 1940)
Bob Feller (260, 1941)
Allie Reynolds (151, 1943)
Bob Feller (348, 1946) Team Record
Bob Feller (196, 1947)
Bob Feller (164, 1948)
Bob Lemon (170, 1950)
Herb Score (245, 1955)
Herb Score (263, 1956)
Early Wynn (184, 1957)
Sam McDowell (325, 1965)
Sam McDowell (225, 1966)
Sam McDowell (283, 1968)
Sam McDowell (279, 1969)
Sam McDowell (304, 1970)
Len Barker (187, 1980)
Len Barker (127, 1981)
Shane Bieber (122, 2020)
Games Started
Stan Coveleski (40, 1921)
George Uhle (40, 1922)
George Uhle (44, 1923) Team Record
George Uhle (36, 1926)
Bob Feller (37, 1940)
Bob Feller (40, 1941)
Jim Bagby Jr. (35, 1942)
Jim Bagby Jr. (33, 1943)
Bob Feller (42, 1946)
Bob Feller (37, 1947)
Bob Feller (38, 1948)
Bob Lemon (37, 1950)
Bob Lemon (34, 1951) Co-Leader
Early Wynn (34, 1951) Co-Leader
Mike Garcia (36, 1952) Co-Leader
Bob Lemon (36, 1952) Co-Leader
Early Wynn (36, 1954)
Early Wynn (37, 1957)
Jim Perry (36, 1960) Co-Leader
Complete Games
Jim Bagby, Sr. (30, 1920)
George Uhle (29, 1923)
Sherry Smith (22, 1925) Co-Leader
George Uhle (32, 1926)
Wes Ferrell (27, 1931) Co-Leader
Bob Feller (24, 1939) Co-Leader
Bob Feller (31, 1940)
Bob Feller (36, 1946) Team Record
Bob Lemon (20, 1948)
Bob Lemon (22, 1950) Co-Leader
Bob Lemon (28, 1952)
Bob Lemon (21, 1954) Co-Leader
Bob Lemon (21, 1956) Co-Leader
Gaylord Perry (29, 1972)
Gaylord Perry (29, 1973)
Tom Candiotti (17, 1986)
Jake Westbrook (5, 2004) Co-Leader
Corey Kluber (5, 2017) Co-Leader
Shutouts
Addie Joss (5, 1902)
Stan Coveleski (9, 1917)
George Uhle (5, 1922)
Stan Coveleski (5, 1923)
Clint Brown (3, 1930)
Oral Hildebrand (6, 1933)
Mel Harder (6, 1934) Co-Leader
Bob Feller (4, 1940) Co-Leader
Al Milnar (4, 1940) Co-Leader
Bob Feller (6, 1941)
Bob Feller (10, 1946) Team Record
Bob Feller (5, 1947)
Bob Lemon (10, 1948) Team Record
Mike Garcia (6, 1952) Co-Leader
Mike Garcia (5, 1954) Co-Leader
Herb Score (5, 1956)
Jim Perry (4, 1960) Co-Leader
Dick Donovan (5, 1962) Co-Leader
Sam McDowell (5, 1966) Co-Leader
Luis Tiant (5, 1966) Co-Leader
Steve Hargan (6, 1967) Co-Leader
Luis Tiant (9, 1968)
Cliff Lee (2, 2008) Co-Leader
Corey Kluber (3, 2017) Co-Leader
Home Runs Allowed
Jim Bagby Jr. (19, 1942)
Bob Feller (22, 1951)
Early Wynn (23, 1952)
Jim Perry (35, 1960)
Luis Tiant (37, 1969)
Walks Allowed
Earl Moore (101, 1902)
Gene Krapp (138, 1911)
George Kahler (121, 1912)
Vean Gregg (124, 1913)
George Uhle (118, 1926)
Wes Ferrell (130, 1931)
Bob Feller (208, 1938) Team Record
Bob Feller (142, 1939)
Bob Feller (194, 1941)
Allie Reynolds (130, 1945)
Bob Feller (153, 1946)
Early Wynn (132, 1952)
Sam McDowell (132, 1965)
Sam McDowell (123, 1967)
Sam McDowell (110, 1968)
Luis Tiant (129, 1969)
Sam McDowell (131, 1970)
Sam McDowell (153, 1971)
Hits Allowed
Jim Bagby, Sr. (277, 1917)
Stan Coveleski (286, 1919)
Jim Bagby, Sr. (338, 1920)
George Uhle (378, 1923) Team Record
George Uhle (300, 1926)
Willis Hudlin (291, 1927)
Bob Feller (284, 1941)
Jim Bagby Jr. (248, 1943)
Bob Feller (277, 1946)
Bob Feller (255, 1948)
Bob Lemon (281, 1950)
Bob Lemon (244, 1951)
Mike Garcia (284, 1952)
Bob Lemon (283, 1953)
Early Wynn (270, 1957)
Cal McLish (253, 1959)
Strikeout to Walk
Bob Feller (2.21, 1940)
Mike Garcia (1.57, 1949)
Sonny Siebert (4.15, 1965)
Dennis Eckersley (3.54, 1977)
Greg Swindell (5.45, 1991)
Losses
Joe Shaute (17, 1924) Co-Leader
Bob Lemon (14, 1951) Co-Leader
Luis Tiant (20, 1969)
Wayne Garland (19, 1977)
Rick Wise (19, 1978)
Earned Runs Allowed
George Uhle (150, 1923) Team Record
Monte Pearson (128, 1934)
Early Wynn (126, 1957)
Jim Perry (117, 1961) Co-Leader
Sam McDowell (101, 1967)
Wild Pitches
Earl Moore (13, 1901) Co-Leader
Otto Hess (18, 1905) Team Record
Bob Rhoads (14, 1907) Co-Leader
Heinie Berger (13, 1909)
Cy Falkenberg (13, 1913)
George Uhle (8, 1926) Co-Leader
Garland Buckeye (10, 1927)
Joe Shaute (7, 1928)
Monte Pearson (15, 1934)
Bob Feller (14, 1939)
Gene Bearden (11, 1949)
Herb Score (12, 1955)
Herb Score (11, 1956)
Cal McLish (8, 1957)
Herb Score (14, 1959)
Sam McDowell (17, 1965)
Sam McDowell (18, 1967)
Sam McDowell (17, 1970)
Gaylord Perry (17, 1973)
Len Barker (14, 1980)
Jack Morris (13, 1994) Co-Leader
Hit Batsmen
Otto Hess (24, 1906) Team Record
Vean Gregg (14, 1913) Co-Leader
George Uhle (13, 1924) Co-Leader
George Uhle (13, 1926)
Earl Whitehill (9, 1938)
Al Smith (6, 1940) Co-Leader
Allie Reynolds (7, 1943)
Batters Faced
Jim Bagby, Sr. (1,364, 1920)
George Uhle (1,548, 1923) Team Record
George Uhle (1,367, 1926)
Bob Feller (1,304, 1940)
Bob Feller (1,466, 1941)
Jim Bagby Jr. (1,135, 1943)
Bob Feller (1,512, 1946)
Bob Feller (1,218, 1947)
Bob Lemon (1,214, 1948)
Bob Lemon (1,254, 1950)
Bob Lemon (1,139, 1951)
Bob Lemon (1,252, 1952)
Bob Lemon (1,216, 1953)
Early Wynn (1,102, 1954)
Early Wynn (1,146, 1957)
Sam McDowell (1,257, 1970)
Games Finished
José Mesa (57, 1995) Co-Leader
Oldest Player
Cy Young (42, 1909)
Deacon McGuire (46, 1910)
Cy Young (44, 1911)
Joe Heving (41, 1942)
Joe Heving (42, 1943)
Joe Heving (43, 1944)
Satchel Paige (42, 1949)
Early Wynn (43, 1963)
Phil Niekro (47, 1986)
Dave Winfield (43, 1995)
Dennis Martínez (41, 1996)
Youngest Player
Ed Cermak (19, 1901)
Mel Harder (18, 1928)
Bob Feller (17, 1936)
Bob Feller (18, 1937)
Vern Freiburger (17, 1941)
Ted Sepkowski (18, 1942)
Mike Lee (19, 1960)
Alfredo Griffin (18, 1976)
Julián Tavárez (20, 1993)
CC Sabathia (20, 2001)

See also
Baseball awards
List of Major League Baseball awards

Footnotes

Award
Major League Baseball team trophies and awards